Lieutenant General Horace Logan McBride (June 29, 1894 – November 14, 1962) was a senior United States Army officer who fought during both World War I and World War II. He commanded American forces in the Ardennes (Battle of the Bulge), the Rhineland, and Central Europe during World War II.

Early life and military career

He attended the University of Nebraska from 1910 to 1911, and then attended and graduated from the United States Military Academy (USMA) at West Point, New York at in 1916. His fellow graduates included future generals such as William M. Hoge, Stanley Eric Reinhart, Calvin DeWitt Jr., Wilhelm D. Styer, Fay B. Prickett, Dwight Johns and Robert Neyland.

On commissioning as a second lieutenant into the Field Artillery Branch, he served as a battery commander in the 347th Field Artillery Regiment, 91st Division, in World War I with the American Expeditionary Force (AEF) under General John Joseph Pershing. He served on the Western Front, taking part in the Meuse–Argonne offensive towards the end of 1918.

He remained in the army after the war, serving as Assistant Military Attaché at The Hague, The Netherlands, and then in Warsaw, Poland in 1919. McBride was Professor of Military Science and Tactics at Yale University from 1923 until 1927. In 1928 he attended and graduated from the Command and General Staff School at Fort Leavenworth, Kansas. He was an instructor at the Field Artillery School from 1928 to 1932, then served in the Philippines from 1932 until 1935. After graduating from the Army War College in 1936, he served as an instructor at the Command and General Staff College from 1936 until 1940. He was stationed at the Panama Canal Zone from 1940 to 1942.

World War II

From April 1942 to March 1943, he served as commander of the 80th Infantry Division Artillery.  McBride was promoted to brigadier general in May 1942.  He assumed command of the entire 80th Infantry Division in 1943 and was promoted to major general in March 1943.  He served as commanding general of the XX Corps from 1945 until 1946.

Post World War II and the Cold War
From 1946 until 1947, McBride served as commanding general of the 9th Division. He served as the first chief of the newly formed Joint American Military Mission for Aid to Turkey (JAMMAT)between 1947 and 1950. He was commandant of the Command and General Staff College from 1950 until 1952.  From 1953 until 1954, he oversaw the Caribbean Command as its commander-in-chief.

He retired in June 1954. Upon his death in 1962 he was buried at Arlington National Cemetery in Arlington, Virginia.

Decorations
His awards included the Distinguished Service Medal, two Silver Stars, the Legion of Merit, the Bronze Star and the Army Commendation Medal.
   Distinguished Service Medal
   Silver Star with oak leaf cluster
   Legion of Merit
   Bronze Star
   Army Commendation Ribbon
   Soviet Order of Alexander Nevsky

References

 National Archives, Archival Research Catalogue , Source: Horace L. McBride papers, Eisenhower Library, 1916–1963, last accessed July 24, 2009
 Generals of World War II

External links

 
Generals of World War II

1894 births
1962 deaths
United States Army Field Artillery Branch personnel
Recipients of the Silver Star
Recipients of the Distinguished Service Medal (US Army)
Recipients of the Legion of Merit
Yale University faculty
United States Army Command and General Staff College alumni
United States Army Command and General Staff College faculty
United States Army generals
Military personnel from Nebraska
People from Madison, Nebraska
Burials at Arlington National Cemetery
Commandants of the United States Army Command and General Staff College
United States Army personnel of World War I
United States Military Academy alumni
United States Army generals of World War II
United States Army War College alumni